The men's triple jump event at the 2002 Commonwealth Games was held on 28 July.

Results

Final

References
Official results
Results at BBC

Triple
2002